Quince Orchard High School (QOHS), also known as Q.O. High School, is a secondary school located on Quince Orchard Road in the Quince Orchard neighborhood of Gaithersburg in Montgomery County, Maryland, United States.

Academics
According to materials from the school, Quince Orchard "encourages advanced studies in both the arts and books." To this end, 31 Advanced Placement courses are offered, ranging from the arts to world history to science and math. The school boasts higher-than-average SAT (544 verbal, 558 math)  and ACT (22 composite) scores, and requires 75 hours of community service for graduation.

In 2006, Quince Orchard High School was the 456th highest-rated school according to Newsweek magazines list of the top 1,300 high schools in the United States.

In 2014, Quince Orchard was ranked the sixth best high school in the state of Maryland and 176th in the United States by U.S. News & World Report on their list of best high schools.

Arts
Over the years, the theater department has staged nearly 50 productions, including Up the Down Staircase and the musical Grease,

Students produce The Prowler newspaper and the yearbook Tracks.

The Quince Orchard High School Marching Band went to the inaugural USSBA National Championship and achieved a Montgomery County-record score of 90.275. The next year, the band received their second record-breaking score for Montgomery County, Maryland, of 92.325, and placed 9th out of 18 national groups. In 2008, the marching band won the USSBA Group IV Open Maryland State Championships with the show "Jekyll and Hyde".

Student demographics
For the 2015–2016 school year, Quince Orchard had a total enrollment of 1,926 students. During the 2015–2016 school year, the school's student body was 51.3% non-Hispanic white, 15.6% African American, 15.7% Asian American, 17.1% Hispanic and Latino American, and 0.3% Native American.

Zone
Quince Orchard's incoming freshmen come from Lakelands Park and Ridgeview Middle School, as well as Roberto Clemente Middle School's magnet program.

Until the end of the 2007 school year, Quince Orchard also enrolled students who had graduated from Kingsview Middle School.

Starting in 2010, Quince Orchard High School enrolled students who graduated from Parkland Middle School.

History

In 1984, the Montgomery County Council voted to build Quince Orchard High School in order to reduce crowding at Gaithersburg High School, and it allocated $20 million for its construction in 1984. The school was expected to have 1,680 students upon opening, and it was designed to have a capacity of 2,000 students. In 1987, a group of parents asked the Board of Education to name the school Potomac Falls High School instead, but the Board of Education decided to name it Quince Orchard High School because it was being built on Quince Orchard Road. Construction costs ended up totaling $26 million by the time the school opened on September 6, 1988.

Quince Orchard High School did not have a senior class during its first school year open, which made it difficult for its athletic teams to compete with other high schools in sports where size and experience are particularly advantageous. Its football team's record was 1-8 in its first season. The softball field was not built in time for the first school year, and the school used the baseball field for field hockey. Despite tennis courts not being completed until midway through the first school year, the tennis team finished 5-7 that year.

Quince Orchard became the first public school in the state of Maryland to have a Sports Broadcasting Network in 2019. The QO Sports Network, founded by student Adam Gotkin, broadcasts select Quince Orchard athletic events.

Notable alumni
Jason Ankrah, NFL football player
Baiyu, singer
Astrid Ellena, Miss Indonesia 2011, Indonesia's representative in Miss World 2011 (Top 15)
Paul James, actor
Zach Kerr, NFL football player
John Papuchis, college football coach
Wale, rapper
Darnell Wilson, boxer
Jesse Tittsworth, DJ/Producer
Mary Wiseman, Star Trek: Discovery actress
Jared Bush, director & film writer

References

External links

Public high schools in Montgomery County, Maryland
Educational institutions established in 1988
1988 establishments in Maryland